Arllat is a village in the District of Pristina, Kosovo. It is located southwest of Drenas.

Notes and references

Notes

References

Villages in Drenas